#Tag Me is the third studio album from Kimberley Chen, produced by Sharp Music, released by Universal Music Taiwan on 15 December 2017. Its first single, "Tag Me", is a fusion of hip hop and dance, which is different from her previous style. "Where I Belong" is the second single from the album, features the rapper Miss Ko who wrote the song. The music video for the third single, "One More Day", features the actor Derek Chang.

This album is her first in 4 years after the release of Kimbonomics. It is also the first album she released after signing a record deal with Sharp Music.

Track listing

Music videos

Live performance

Promotional concert

References

External links 
 G-Music
 Five Music
 books.com.tw
 friDay
 KKBOX
 MyMusic

Kimberley Chen albums
2017 albums
Mandopop albums